The Sham Shui Po District Council is the district council for the Sham Shui Po District in Hong Kong. It is one of 18 such councils. The Sham Shui Po District Council currently consists of 25 members, of which the district is divided into 25 constituencies, electing a total of 25 members. The last election was held on 24 November 2019.

History
The Sham Shui Po District Council was established on 22 October 1981 under the name of the Sham Shui Po District Board as the result of the colonial Governor Murray MacLehose's District Administration Scheme reform. The District Board was partly elected with the ex-officio Urban Council members, as well as members appointed by the Governor until 1994 when last Governor Chris Patten refrained from appointing any member.

The Sham Shui Po District Board became Sham Shui Po Provisional District Board after the Hong Kong Special Administrative Region (HKSAR) was established in 1997 with the appointment system being reintroduced by Chief Executive Tung Chee-hwa. The current Sham Shui Po District Council was established on 1 January 2000 after the first District Council election in 1999. The council has become fully elected when the appointed seats were abolished in 2011 after the modified constitutional reform proposal was passed by the Legislative Council in 2010.

Partly because of the large presence of the low-income group in Sham Shui Po, the area has bred many pro-grassroots politicians. Social activists from the grassroots political groups Hong Kong People's Council on Public Housing Policy and the Sham Shui Po Residents Livelihood Concern Group had their roots in the district, which later formed the Hong Kong Association for Democracy and People's Livelihood (ADPL), one of the earlier pro-democracy political groups in the 1980s.

With the strong presence of the ADPL in the district, the ADPL gained majority of the council from 1994 to 1997 and took control of the council from 2000 to 2007 with its pro-democracy allies. It also returned its longtime chairman Frederick Fung in the Kowloon West constituency, in which Sham Shui Po is the biggest area, to the Legislative Council from 1991 to 1997 and from 1998 to 2012.

However, Hong Kong's largest pro-government and pro-Beijing party, the Democratic Alliance for the Betterment of Hong Kong (DAB), gained a foothold in Sham Shui Po in recent years with large amount of resources. In the 2007 District Council election, the pan-democrats lost control of the council for the first time, in which the seats commanded by pro-democracy and pro-Beijing forces were split even with the help of the government-appointed seats. The ADPL suffered further loss in the 2011 District Council election, losing the control of the council to the pro-Beijing camp.

In the 2015 District Council election, the district's first election after Umbrella Revolution, the pan-democrats regained almost half of the seats in the district council with 11 seats in their possession. as composed to pro-Beijing camp's 12 seats, despite the downfall of Frederick Fung in his Lai Kok constituency, being defeated by a DAB new face Chan Wing-yan.

Amid the massive pro-democracy protests, the pro-democrats scored a historic landslide victory by taking 22 of the 25 seats in the 2019 District Council election. The ADPL retained the status of the largest party, securing 11 seats in total.

Political control
Since 1982 political control of the council has been held by the following parties:

Political makeup

Elections are held every four years.

District result maps

Members represented
Starting from 1 January 2020:

Leadership

Chairs
Since 1985, the chairman is elected by all the members of the board:

Vice Chairs

Notes

References

External links
Shan Shui Po at the Hong Kong Government District Councils website 

 
Districts of Hong Kong
Sham Shui Po District